Freddy Fazbear's Pizzeria Simulator is a freeware point-and-click business simulation survival horror video game developed and published by Scott Cawthon. The game was released on December 4, 2017 on Steam and Game Jolt. It is the sixth main installment of the Five Nights at Freddy's video game series, the seventh game overall, and is chronologically set after the events of the third game. Initially marketed as a simulation game, where the player manages their own franchised pizzeria, the game is gradually revealed to continue its predecessors' concept of surviving against hostile animatronic characters for multiple nights in a row.

A mobile version for iOS and Android titled FNaF 6: Pizzeria Simulator was released on August 13, 2019. Unlike the PC version, the mobile release, which is developed and published by Clickteam LLC USA, is pay-to-play. A Nintendo Switch and Xbox One port was released on October 31, 2020, with a PlayStation 4 port released on March 31, 2021. A planned add-on, Ultimate Custom Night, was released as a standalone game on June 27, 2018. While it did not receive many reviews, critics praised the hybrid gameplay.

Gameplay
Freddy Fazbear's Pizzeria Simulator begins as an 8-bit minigame where the player must control the titular Freddy Fazbear and distribute pizzas to several children. This minigame eventually ends in a scripted glitch.

The game then switches to a dark room where the player faces a broken version of the animatronic Circus Baby from Five Nights at Freddy's: Sister Location (now known as "Scrap Baby"). A voice from a cassette tape instructs the player to observe the animatronic and document their responses to various audio simulations. A checklist must be filled containing the options "no", "yes" and "unsure". At the third audio stimulation, Scrap Baby speaks to the player, with the game suddenly jumping to the game's start menu.

The game then turns into a business simulation, where the player buys decorations for their fictional restaurant and places them around the restaurant. Buying these items can increase the atmosphere, health/safety and entertainment standards, with the possibility of also giving them extra revenue. However, many of these items can also increase liability risk and lead to lawsuits which can be fought or settled, both at the cost of money. Sponsorship offers can be accepted for money but can cause audio and visual distractions for the player later in the game. Arcade games placed in the restaurant can also be interacted with to play minigames, increasing their "Faz-Points". Faz-Points are the in-game points earned whenever the player plays the minigames or buys a new item and places it in the pizzeria. For every 1000 points increased, the player gets $100. Some minigames such as, "Fruity Maze", "Midnight Motorist", and "Security Puppet" have their own story inside the main game that all connect to Fazbear Entertainment's co-founder and series antagonist, William Afton.

The next portion of the game sees the player using a computer to complete various tasks to maintain the restaurant. However, any hostile animatronics loose in the establishment will try to attack the player. They can be stopped by shining the player's flashlight into the ventilation openings or by using audio to lure animatronics away. The player can use a network of motion detectors to track the animatronics' movements from one location to another. The player can also use the silent ventilation to reduce the noise, but only one of the systems from the motion detector, audio lure and silent ventilation can be used. Unlike the previous games in the series, all four animatronics in the game (Scrap Baby, Molten Freddy, Scraptrap, and Lefty) share the same behavior as opposed to having different mechanics. The player may upgrade the office equipment in order to increase efficiency and reduce the noise level. The player may also temporarily shut off the computer or switch to a secondary ventilation system that runs more quietly, but is not as effective in controlling the ambient temperature. Any sponsorships accepted will cause loud advertisements to be played randomly on the computer, attracting the animatronics and making the player unable to hear them or do anything for several seconds, until the ads are skipped. This portion ends when the daily tasks are done and the computer is logged off.

After completing the management, the player will be directed to the salvage segment, where the animatronics will be presented in the same setting as Scrap Baby. Each day, one of the four animatronics will be offered to be salvaged at their own prices. Just like the earlier setting, the player has to tick the checklist. Unlike the previous setting, the animatronic only moves when the player is looking down at the checklist. If the player feels the animatronic is about to jumpscare them, they are able to subdue it by using a taser. However, the animatronic loses value if it is tasered more than three times, lowering the amount of profit that could be obtained from it. If the player is successful in this portion of the game, they earn a cash reward. If unsuccessful, no cash reward will be obtained. Regardless of their success, the animatronic will immediately serve as a threat in the management section. On the other hand, the player can refuse to salvage the animatronic and discard it, which leads to alternate ending. If the animatronic has already entered through marked down items before its salvage segment, then a cutout will be present, with the only option being to throw it out.

In order to finish the game, the player must survive six full days and nights. Several different endings are possible, depending on factors such as the degree of improvement made to the pizzeria, the number of lawsuits brought against the pizzeria by customers, and whether or not the player salvaged every animatronic, among other conditions.

Plot
The player character (implied to be Michael Afton, the main character of Sister Location) is the new franchiser of the re-branded Fazbear Entertainment Inc., with headquarters in Washington County, Utah. After investing in the restaurant, the player is left with $100 to spend on their new venue. After the first night, they are encouraged to prepare for their "ultimate test", which is a big party on Saturday. Under the guidance of "Tutorial Unit", the restaurant's artificial intelligence, the player invests in various props, animatronics, and sponsors to add to and fund the restaurant.

In addition to running the restaurant, the player, under obligations of "Paragraph 4", must also check maintenance at the end of each day with four possessed and dilapidated animatronics: Scrap Baby, which is Circus Baby rebuilt from scraps after being ejected from Ennard following the events of Five Nights at Freddy's: Sister Location; Molten Freddy, the remains of Ennard with Funtime Freddy as its primary head; Lefty, a mysterious black bear animatronic; and Springtrap (nicknamed "Scraptrap"), the worn-out Spring Bonnie costume which contains the undead body of serial killer and Fazbear co-founder William Afton, who survived the destruction of Fazbear's Fright. The player can either complete the maintenance under the guidance of the mysterious "Cassette Man" before salvaging the animatronics, or throw them back outside, unless they have already sneaked in the pizzeria through a previously-purchased discounted object. The player is left to survive each night as the salvaged animatronics attempt to kill them.

Endings
A total of seven endings exist for the game, with all but one granting the player a certificate on the title screen.
 If the player has invested in the restaurant but does not have all four salvageable animatronics in the pizzeria by Saturday, they will be fired from the job by the Cassette Man. This is the only ending that does not earn the player a certificate.
 Mediocrity – If the player does not buy anything or salvage any animatronic by Saturday, they will be fired and berated by the Tutorial Unit for their laziness. This earns the player the "Certificate of Mediocrity".
 Insanity – If the player purchases the Egg Baby data archive, they can discover blueprints on their computer and an audio file recorded by the Cassette Man, who is implied to be Henry Emily, a co-founder of Fazbear Entertainment alongside Afton. He laments Afton's actions and his own complacency in them, before discussing his plan to free all the lost souls trapped in the animatronics. To cover up their discovery, the player is then deemed insane by Tutorial Unit and fired. This earns the player the "Certificate of Insanity". 
 Blacklisted – If the player's restaurant has a liability risk of 50 or higher by Saturday, they will be reprimanded by Tutorial Unit for their negligence and fired. This earns the player the "You Have Been Blacklisted" certificate.
 Bankruptcy – If the player ends up in debt while fighting or settling a lawsuit, they will be fired by Tutorial Unit for being a "lost cause". This earns the player the "Certificate of Bankruptcy".
 Completion – If the player has salvaged all the animatronics and reached the final night, Scrap Baby tells the player that they have been deceived into giving her a "gift" by gathering all the souls in one place and that she will make her father (Afton) proud. However, the Cassette Man / Henry interrupts her and reveals that he had constructed the restaurant to trap all the animatronics inside. He begins burning it down to both end the murderous legacy of Afton and Freddy Fazbear's Pizza, and to free the spirits inside the animatronics, including Afton's daughter Elizabeth inside Scrap Baby, his own daughter inside the Puppet (from Five Nights at Freddy's 2) that was captured by Lefty, and the spirits of Afton's other victims inside Molten Freddy. After taunting his "old friend" Afton, Henry remains in the burning building to die alongside the animatronics. He also acknowledges that the player has also decided to stay and die in the fire, implying that the player character is William's son and Elizabeth's brother Michael, who had previously survived his encounter with Ennard. Upon achieving this ending, the player is congratulated by Tutorial Unit for finishing the work week and informed that Fazbear will no longer be a corporate entity. This earns the player the "Certificate of Completion". 
 Lorekeeper – If the player has discovered the secret endings within the "Fruity Maze", "Midnight Motorist", and "Security Puppet" minigames, an illustration of a peaceful graveyard will appear at the end of the game, which has six gravestones with the names of the children who were Afton's victims. Any playthrough where all three secret minigame endings will earn the player the "You Are the Lorekeeper" certificate.

Development and release
In June 2017, Cawthon hinted towards the development of a sixth main game in the series, with a teaser on scottgames.com showing a picture that appeared to be Circus Baby from Five Nights at Freddy's: Sister Location, but later announced his decision to cancel the game and instead develop a separate installment similar to FNaF World such as a "pizzeria tycoon". Teasers for a new game began appearing on Cawthon's website in late 2017. On December 4, 2017, Cawthon released Freddy Fazbear's Pizzeria Simulator on Steam as freeware, which fans presumed to be the game he had referred to previously. In February 2018, Cawthon announced he would be developing an update for the game which would feature over fifty animatronics: this later became a separate game named Ultimate Custom Night (2018).

On August 13, 2019, paid iOS and Android ports were published by Clickteam under the title FNaF 6: Pizzeria Simulator. Clickteam later released ports for the Nintendo Switch, Xbox One and PlayStation 4.

Reception
Freddy Fazbear's Pizzeria Simulator did not receive many reviews from critics. TouchArcade gave the game three and-a-half stars and praised its hybrid gameplay as a "fun take on the FNAF formula with some extra elements", as opposed to previous sequels, which it considered "uninspired". While praising Pizzeria Simulator's ability to elicit fear and tension, Rock Paper Shotgun said that its free-of-charge release was justified as it was "not indicative of quality or length […] but it does mean that Cawthon can get away with tricking players" by describing the game as a pizzeria tycoon spin-off. IGN included the game in its list of the "18 Best Horror Games of 2017". The Polish CD-Action described the game as a "lame tycoon but a quite decent FNAF".

Both CBR and GameCrate noted the "deep lore": GameCrate described the game as an "absolute must play" for fans as it tied up "all the loose ends" in the series' backstory, but noted that the lore was only accessible by risking an increase in difficulty. They also praised the gameplay as "genuinely fun" and observed how earlier segments influenced the difficulty of the survival horror gameplay each night.

Notes

References

2017 video games
Business simulation games
Horror video games
Pizzeria Simulator
Indie video games
IOS games
Point-and-click adventure games
Video games about robots
Single-player video games
Video game sequels
Video games developed in the United States
Video games set in Utah
Video games with alternate endings
Windows games
Clickteam Fusion games
Android (operating system) games
Works about missing people
PlayStation 4 games
Xbox One games
Nintendo Switch games